Nancey Murphy (born 12 June 1951) is an American philosopher and theologian who is Professor of Christian Philosophy at Fuller Theological Seminary, Pasadena, CA. She received the B.A. from Creighton University (philosophy and psychology) in 1973, the Ph.D. from University of California, Berkeley (philosophy of science) in 1980, and the Th.D. from the Graduate Theological Union (theology) in 1987.

Career
Murphy's research interests focus on the role of modern and postmodern philosophy in shaping Christian theology; on relations between theology and science; and most recently on philosophy of mind and neuroscience. Her first book, Theology in the Age of Scientific Reasoning (Cornell, 1990) won the American Academy of Religion award for excellence. She is author of nine other books, including Anglo-American Postmodernity: Philosophical Perspectives on Science, Religion, and Ethics (Westview, 1997); and On the Moral Nature of the Universe: Theology, Cosmology, and Ethics (with G.F.R Ellis, Fortress, 1996), the later of which was awarded the Templeton Prize for Progress in Religion. Her most recent books are Bodies and Souls, or Spirited Bodies? (Cambridge, 2006); and (co-authored with Warren Brown) Did My Neurons Make Me Do It? Philosophical and Neurobiological Perspectives on Moral Responsibility and Free Will (Oxford, 2007).

Murphy has co-edited eleven volumes, including (with L. Schultz and R.J. Russell, Brill 2009) Philosophy, Science, and Divine Action; (with G.F.R. Ellis and T. O'Connor, Springer, 2009) Downward Causation and the Neurobiology of Free Will, Springer; and (with W. R. Stoeger, Oxford, 2007) Evolution and Emergence: Systems, Organisms, Persons.

Murphy is a member of the board of directors of the Center for Theology and the Natural Sciences (and former chair of the board); the American Philosophical Association; and the Society of Christian Philosophers. She has served as an advisor to the American Association for the Advancement of Science's program on dialogue between science, ethics, and religion, and serves on long-term planning committees for a series of conferences on science and divine action and on the problem of natural evil sponsored by the Vatican Observatory.

In 1998 Murphy was Creighton University's alumnus of the year, and in 2006, GTU Alumnus of the year. She was the 1999 J.K Russell Fellow at the Center for Theology and the Natural Sciences. She was elected to the International Society for Science and Religion and serves on its steering committee. In 2007 she was included in the Los Angeles Magazine 100 most influential people. She is an ordained minister in the Church of the Brethren.

Books
 2018. A Philosophy of the Christian Religion for the Twenty-First Century, SPCK. 
 2007. (with W. S. Brown) Did My Neurons Make Me Do It?: Philosophical and Neurobiological Perspectives on Moral Responsibility and Free Will, Oxford University Press. 
 2006. Bodies and Souls, or Spirited Bodies? Cambridge University Press. 
 2002. Religion and Science: God, Evolution, and the Soul (ed. Carl S. Helrich), Pandora Press.
 1997. Reconciling Theology and Science: A Radical Reformation Perspective, Pandora Press. 
 1997. Anglo-American Postmodernity: Philosophical Perspectives on Science, Religion, and Ethics, Westview Press. 
 1996. (with George F.R. Ellis) On the Moral Nature of the Universe: Theology, Cosmology, and Ethics, Fortress Press. 
 1996. Beyond Liberalism and Fundamentalism: How Modern and Postmodern Philosophy Set the Theological Agenda, Trinity Press International. 
 1994. Reasoning and Rhetoric in Religion, Trinity Press International. 
 1990. Theology in the Age of Scientific Reasoning, Cornell University Press.

Edited volumes
 2010. Human Identity at the Intersection of Science, Technology, and Religion, Ashgate.
 2009. Philosophy, Science, and Divine Action, Brill.
 2009. Downward Causation and the Neurobiology of Free Will, Springer.
 2008. (with R.J. Russell and W.R. Stoeger, eds.) Scientific Perspectives on Divine Action: Twenty Years of Problems and Progress, Vatican Observatory Press.
 2007. (with W. R. Stoeger, ed.) Evolution and Emergence: Systems, Organism, Persons, Oxford University Press.
 2007. (with R.J. Russell and W.R. Stoeger, eds.) Physics and Cosmology: Scientific Perspectives on Suffering in Nature, Vatican Observatory Press.
 1999. (with R.J. Russell, T.C. Meyering, and M. A. Arbib, eds.) Neuroscience and the Person: Scientific Perspectives on Divine Action, Vatican Observatory Press.
 1998. Whatever Happened to the Soul?: Scientific and Theological Portraits of Human Nature, Fortress Press.
 1997. Virtues and Practices in the Christian Tradition:Christian Ethics after MacIntyre, Trinity Press International.
 1995. (with R.J. Russell and A.R. Peacocke, eds.) Chaos and Complexity: Scientific Perspectives on Divine Action, Vatican Observatory Press.
 1994. (with S. Hauerwas and M. Nation, eds.) Theology without Foundations: Religious Practice and the Future of Theological Truth, Abingdon Press.
 1993. (with R.J. Russell and C.J. Isham, eds.) Quantum Cosmology and the Laws of Nature: Divine Action in Scientific Perspective, Vatican Observatory Press.

Contributions to scholarly texts
 2010. "Nonreductive Physicalism," in A. Runehov, ed., Encyclopedia of Sciences and Religions, Springer (forthcoming).
 2010. "Divine Action, Emergence, and Scientific Explanation," in Peter Harrison, ed., Cambridge Companion to Science and Religion (forthcoming).
 2010. "Reduction and Emergence: A Critical Perspective," in N. Murphy and C. Knight, eds., Human Identity at the Intersection of Science, Technology, and Religion, Ashgate (forthcoming).
 2010. "Theology and Science in a Postmodern Context"; "Science and Divine Action"; and "Theology, Science and Human Nature," in M. Stewart, ed., Science and Religion in Dialogue, vol. 2, Wiley-Blackwell (also published in Chinese).
 2009. "Adolf Grünbaum on Religion, Cosmology, and Morals," in A Jokic, ed., Philosophy, Religion, Physics, and Psychology: Essays in Honor of Adolf Grünbaum, Promethius Books.
 2009. "Non-reductive Physicalism and Free Will", in E. Weislogal, ed., Transdisciplinarity in Science and Religion, Curtea Veche Publishing House.
 2009. "The Cognitive Science of Religion: A Theological Appropriation," in J. Schloss, and M.J. Murray, eds., The Spiritual Primate: Scientific, Philosophical and Theological Perspectives on the Origin of Religion, Oxford University Press.
 2009. "Reduction and Emergence: A Critical Perspective," in W. Van Huyysteen et al., eds. Understanding Humans in a Scientific Age, Ashgate (forthcoming).
 2009. "Agape and Nonviolence," in Craig Boyd, ed., Visions of Agape, Ashgate (forthcoming).
 2009. "The Role of Philosophy in the Science/Religion Dialogue," and "Supervenience" in H. A. Campbell and H. Looy, eds., A Science and Religion Primer, Baker.
 2008. (with J. Schloss) "Biology and Religion," in M. Ruse, ed., Oxford Handbook of Biology, Oxford University Press.
 2008. (with V. Ignatkof) "Atheism," and "Epistemology," in W. Dyrness and V-M. Karkkainen, eds., Global Dictionary of Theology, IVP.
 2008. "Neuroscience, Determinism, and Downward Causation: Defusing the Free-Will Problem," in F. Watts, ed., Creation: Law and Probability, Ashgate.
 2008. "MacIntyre, Tradition-Dependent Rationality and the End of Philosophy of Religion," in D. Cheetham and R. King, eds., Contemporary Method and Practice in the Philosophy of Religion: New Essays, Continuum Press.
 2007. "Science, Divine Action, and the Intelligent Design Movement: A Defense of Theistic Evolution," in R. B. Stewart, ed., Intelligent Design: William A. Dembski and Michael Ruse in Dialogue, Fortress Press.
 2007. "Anglo-American Postmodernity and the End of Theology-Science Dialogue?" in P. Clayton, ed., Oxford Handbook of Religion and Science, Oxford University Press.
 2007. "Natural Science," in J. Webster et al., eds., Oxford Handbook of Systematic Theology, Oxford University Press.
 2006. "Emergence and Mental Causation," in P. Davies and P. Clayton, eds., The Re-Emergence of Emergence, Oxford University Press.
 2006. "Nonreductive Physicalism: Philosophical Challenges," in R. Lints et al. eds., Personal Identity in Theological Perspective, Eerdmans.
 2006. "Theological Reflections on the Moral Nature of Nature," in U. Gorman, ed., Creative Creatures: Values and Ethical Issues in Theology, Science, and Technology, T & T Clark.
 2005. "Is Theology Possible at the End of Modernity?" in M. Parker and T. Schmidt, eds., Scientific Explanation and Religious Belief, Mohr-Siebeck.
 2005. "Nonreductive Physicalism," in J. Green and S. Palmer, eds., In Search of the Soul? Four Views, IVP.
 2005. "Philosophical Resources for Integration," "Theological Resources for Integration," and "Constructing a Radical-Reformation Research Program in Psychology," in A. Dueck et al., ed., Theology and Psychology: A Radical Reformation Perspective, Eerdmans
 2005. "Reduktionismus" and "Imre Lakatos" in Religion in Geschichte und Gegenwort, 4th ed.
 2004. "Epistemology," in K. Vanhoozer et al., Dictionary for Theological Interpretation of Scripture, Baker.
 2003. "Anglo-American Postmodern Theology: A Theology of Communal Praxis," (with Brad Kallenberg) in K. J. Vanhoozer, ed., The Cambridge Companion to Postmodern Theology.
 2002. "The Resurrection of the Body and Personal Identity: Possibilities and Limitations of Eschatological Knowledge," in M. Welker, ed., Theology, Natural Science, and Cultural Studies on Resurrection, Eerdmans.
 2002. "At the Intersection of Several Possible Worlds" in G. Yancy, ed., The Philosophical I: Personal Reflections on Life in Philosophy, Rowman and Littlefield.
 2002. "Neuroscience and Human Nature: A Christian Perspective," in Ted Peters and Muzaffar Iqbal, eds., God, Life, and the Cosmos: Theistic Perspectives, Ashgate.
 2000. "What Has Theology to Learn from Scientific Methodology?" in M. Peterson et al., eds., Philosophy of Religion: Selected Readings, 2nd. ed., Oxford University Press.
 2000. "Inquiring after God by Means of Scientific Study," in Ellen Charry, ed., Inquiring after God, Blackwell.
 2000. "Science and Society," in J.W. McClendon, Witness: Systematic Theology, Volume III, Abingdon.
 1999. "John Howard Yoder's Systematic Defense of Pacifism," in S. Hauerwas et al., eds., The Wisdom of the Cross: Essays in Honor of John Howard Yoder, Eerdmans.
 1999. "Overcoming Hume on His Own Terms," in D.Z. Phillips and T. Tessin, eds., Religion and Hume's Legacy, Macmillan.
 1998. "Religion and Science," in Routledge Encyclopedia of Philosophy.
 1992. "Philosophical Theology," in Donald Musser and Joseph Price, eds., A New Handbook of Christian Theology, Abingdon.

Selected journal articles
 2010. "Cosmopolis: How Astronomy Affects Philosophies of Human Nature and Religion," in Analecta Husserliana (forthcoming).
 2010. "Christianity and Modern Science in the West: An Overview", Omega: Indian Journal of Science and Religion (forthcoming).
 2009. "How to Keep the 'Non' in Nonreductive Physicalism," Journal of European Baptist Studies, 9, 2.
 2008. "Miks Teadus Vajab Teologiat?" (Estonian translation of "Why Science Needs Theology") Usuteaduslik Ajakiri 57, 1.
 2008. "On the Role of Philosophy in Theology-Science Dialogue," in J. J. Vila-Cha, ed., Filosofia e Ciencia: Science in Philosophy, Revista Portuguesa de Filosofia.
 2006. "Scientific Perspectives on Christian Anthropology," Reflections: Center of Theological Inquiry, spring.
 2003. "Whatever Happened to the Soul?: Theological Perspectives on Neuroscience and the Self," in J. LeDoux et al., eds., The Self: From Soul to Brain, vol. 1001 of Annals of the New York Academy of Science.
 2003. "On the Role of Philosophy in Theology-Science Dialogue," Theology and Science, 1,1.
 2002. "Divine Creation and Cosmology," Acta Philosophia: Rivista Internazionale de Filosofia.
 2002. "The Problem of Mental Causation: How Does Reason Get Its Grip on the Brain?" Science and Christian Belief, October.
 1999. "Darwin, Social Theory, and the Sociology of Scientific Knowledge"; "Physicalism without Reductionism: Toward a Scientifically, Philosophically, and Theologically Sound Portrait of Human Nature"; and "Theology and Science within a Lakatosian Program," Zygon, December.
 1996. "Philosophical Resources for Postmodern Evangelical Theology," Christian Scholar's Review, winter.
 1995. "Postmodern Non-Relativism: Imre Lakatos, Theo Meyering, and Alasdair MacIntyre,"Philosophical Forum, no. 1.
 1993. "Philosophical Fractals; Or History as Metaphilosophy," Studies in History and Philosophy of Science, no. 3.
 1993. "Phillip Johnson on Trial: A Critique of his Critique of Darwin," Perspectives on Science and the Christian Faith, March.
 1990. "Scientific Realism and Postmodern Philosophy," The British Journal for The Philosophy of Science, vol. 41.
 1989. (with James McClendon) "Distinguishing Modern and Postmodern Theologies," Modern Theology, April.
 1989. "Another Look at Novel Facts," Studies in History and Philosophy of Science, no. 3.
 1984. "Proliferation of Models and the Quest for Progress in Psychiatry," Explorations in Knowledge, no. 1.

Selected public appearances
 2010. "Do Christians Need Souls?: Current Debates on Neuroscience and Human Nature"; and "Moral Responsibility and Free Will: Neurobiological Perspectives"presented at Southern Oregon University.
 2010. "Some Reflections on Physicalism," presented at the Evangelical Theological Society meeting, Tacoma, WA.
 2009. "Bodies and Souls, or Spirited Bodies?" presented at International Conference of Life Education, National Taiwan University.
 2009. "Cosmopolis: How Astronomy Shapes Religion and Philosophies of Human Nature," Astronomy and Civilization Conference, Budapest.
 2009. "Anglo-American Postmodern Philosophy—Really?" and "Why Christians Should Be Physicalists," Jellema Lecutres, Calvin College.
 2009. "Bodies and Souls, or Spirited Bodies?", Witherspoon Lecture, Queen's University.
 2008. "Is 'Nonreductive Physicalism' an Oxymoron?" American Philosophical Association, Philadelphia.
 2008. Intensive course on theology and science, Seventh Day Adventist Seminary, Florence.
 2008. "Theology and Science in a Postmodern Context," "Theology, Science, and Human Nature," and "Science and Divine Action" presented at Peking and Renmin Universities.
 2008. "Alasdair MacIntyre's Role in the Development of Contemporary Philosophical Ethics," "Why Science Needs Theology," and "Naturalism and Theism as Competing Traditions, or the Importance of Worldview in Science," Tartu University, Estonia.
 2008. "Nonreductive Physicalism and Free Will," Metnexus Conference, Madrid.
 2008. "When Jesus Said 'Love Your Enemies' I Think He Probably Meant Don't Kill Them," presented at Chinese-Western "Conference on Law and Love," Berlin.
 2008. "Downward Causation versus Causal Reductionism: Shewing the Fly out of the Fly- Bottle," European Society for Philosophy and Psychology, Utrecht.
 2008. "Neuroscience, Christian Anthropology, and the Role of Women in the Church," St. Mary's College, Notre Dame.
 2008. "Spirited Bodies: Human Nature in Philosophy, Science, and Baptist Theology," The Charles H. Townes Lecture, Furman University.
 2008. "The New Atheism and the Scientific-Naturalist Tradition," Creighton University.
 2007. "Christian Theology, Scientific Naturalism, and Science: An Epistemological Assessment," presented at St. Andrew's Biblical Theological Institute, Moscow.
 2007. "Scientific Atheism: A Christian Response," presented at St. Andrew's Presbyterian College, Laurinburg, NC.
 2007. "Human Nature at the Intersection: Philosophy, Science, and Baptist Theology," presented at Carson-Newman College, Jefferson City, TN.
 2007. "Nonreductive Physicalism, Divine Action, and Striving to Know the Will of God," presented at Sophia Europa Conference, Oxford.
 2007. "Cognitive Science and the Evolution of Religion: A Philosophical and Theological Appraisal," Christians in Science and American Scientific Affiliation conference, University of Edinburgh.
 2007. "Naturalism and Theism as Competing Large-Scale Traditions," University of Lancaster.
 2006. "Naturalism and Theism as Competing Traditions," Austrian Wittgenstein Society conference, Kirchberg, Austria.
 2006. "One (Irish) Theologian's Reflections on the Cognitive Science of Religion," Institute for Cognition and Culture, Belfast.
 2006. Reid Lectures, Westminster College, Cambridge.
 2006. "Physicalism or Dualism: Which Way for People of Faith?" and "Suffering at the Hands of Nature: Where Was God?" at Tehran International Congress on Science and Religion.
 2005. "From Theological Anthropology and Neuroscience to an Ethic of Discipleship," St. Andrew's Biblical Theological College, Moscow.
 2005. "Hebraic and Christian Views of Human Nature," conference on neuro-ethics at MIT.
 2005. "Scientific Perspectives on Christian Anthropology," presented at the Center of Theological Inquiry, Princeton; Yale Divinity School; and Pepperdine University.
 2005. "Whatever Happened to the Soul?," and "Reason, Religion and Science: A Response to Richard Dawkins," Journalists' Fellowship Program, Cambridge University.
 2005. "From Neurons to Politics--Without a Soul," presented at Eastern Mennonite University; and Wesleyan Philosophical Society, Seattle Pacific University.
 2004. "Downward Causation and The Freedom of the Will," Austin Farrer Centenary Conference, Oxford.
 2004. "Neuroscience, Determinism, and Downward Causation: Defusing the Free-Will Problem,"plenary address, International Society for Science and Religion, Boston.
 2003. "Is Theology Possible at the End of Modernity?" Johann Wolfgang Goethe University, Frankfurt.
 2003. Nordenhaug Lectures, International Baptist Theological Seminary, Prague.
 2003. Integration Lectures, Graduate School of Psychology, Fuller Seminary.
 2003. Scottish Journal of Theology Lectures, Aberdeen.
 2002. "Theological Reflections on the Moral Nature of Nature," plenary lecture, European Society for the Study of Science and Theology, Nijmegen; and University of Aarhus, Denmark.
 2001. "The Problem of Mental Causation: How Does Reason Get Its Grip on the Brain?" St. Edmund's College, and "How Christian Physicalists Can Avoid Losing Their Minds: An Essay on the Problem of Mental Causation," seminar, Divinity Faculty,Cambridge University.
 2001. "The Resurrection of the Body, Emotion and Personal Identity," Internationales Wissenschaftsforum, Heidelberg.
 2001. "Why Christians Should Be Physicalists" and "How Physicalists Can Avoid Being Reductionists," Adelaide, Australia.
 2001. "Divine Creation and Cosmology," Pontifical University of the Holy Cross, Rome.
 2001. "A Glimpse at Science Through the Eyes of American Protestantism," zoology department, Cambridge University.
 2000. "What is the Nature of Theology?" Wycliffe Hall, Oxford.
 2000. "Is Theology Possible at the End of Modernity?" Harris Manchester College, Oxford.
 2000. "Reconsidering Our Dusty Origins: The Good Life for Humankind in the New Millennium," Reykyavik, Iceland.
 2000. "Top-Down Mental Causation: An Argument for Nonreductive Physicalism," Marquette University philosophy colloquium.
 1998. "Pluralism and Christianity: A Radical-Reformation Perspective," University of Groningen.
 1998. "The Nonviolent Direct Action of God," Pretoria, South Africa.
 1998. "Neuroscience and Theology," Johannesburg, South Africa.
 1998. "Supervenience, Downward Causation, and Free Will: A Nonreductive Physicalist Account of Human Action," Pasierbiec, Poland.
 1998. "Supervenience Redefined," philosophy colloquium, U.C. Irvine.
 1998. "Nonreductive Physicalism: Philosophical Issues," American Scientific Affiliation and Christians in Science, Cambridge University.
 1997. "Overcoming Hume on his Own Terms," Claremont Philosophy of Religion Conference.
 1995. "Theology and Ethics in the Hierarchy of the Sciences," plenary address, Upper Midwest Regional AAR/SBL, St. Paul, MN.
 1994. The Rockwell Lectures: "Experience or Scripture: How Do We Know God?" "Immanence or Intervention: How Does God Act in the World?" and "Postmodernity: The End of Liberalism and Fundamentalism?" Rice University, Houston, TX.
 1994. "Postmodernism: What is it? and Why Should a Lawyer Care?" at Rutgers University School of Law, Camden, NJ.
 1993. "Postmodern Non-Relativism: Imre Lakatos and Alasdair MacIntyre," Boston Colloquium for the Philosophy of Science, Boston University.

References

External links
Festschrift dedicated to Nancey Murphy
Books by Nancey Murphy available via the Fuller Theological Seminary Online Bookstore
Pepperdine University's Dean Lecture Series

University of California, Berkeley alumni
Creighton University alumni
American women philosophers
American Christian theologians
Living people
Graduate Theological Union alumni
Fuller Theological Seminary faculty
Church of the Brethren clergy
Philosophers of science
20th-century American philosophers
21st-century American philosophers
Women Christian theologians
1951 births
Anabaptist philosophers
20th-century American women
21st-century American women
Anabaptist theologians